Sanna can refer to the rivers

 Sanna (Inn), a river in Austria, a tributary to the Inn
 Sanna (Vistula), a river in Poland, a tributary to the Vistula